"Get That Jive" is a song by Australian–New Zealand band Dragon released in March 1977 as the second single from the band's third studio album, Sunshine (1977). "Get That Jive" peaked at No. 13 on the Australian Kent Music Report. It was the first of the group's singles to feature drummer Kerry Jacobson.

Track listing 
 Get That Jive (Paul Hewson) – 2:44
 On the Beachhead (Robert Taylor) – 4:00

Charts

Weekly charts

Year-end charts

Personnel 
 Paul Hewson – keyboards
 Marc Hunter — lead vocals
 Todd Hunter — bass guitar
 Kerry Jacobson – drums 
 Robert M. Taylor – Guitars (electric, acoustic)

Production
 Producer  – Peter Dawkins

References 

1977 songs
1977 singles
Dragon (band) songs
Portrait Records singles
CBS Records singles
Song recordings produced by Peter Dawkins (musician)